Crayon Shin-chan: Crash! Graffiti Kingdom and Almost Four Heroes is a 2020 Japanese anime film produced by Shin-Ei Animation. It is the 28th film of the popular comedy manga and anime series Crayon Shin-chan. The film was originally scheduled for release to theaters on April 24, 2020, in Japan, but was postponed to September 11, 2020, due to concerns over the COVID-19 pandemic.

The slogan of the movie is "Save the world with Crayons".

Premise
The film's story features a "magical crayon," and centers around a floating kingdom called Rakuga Kingdom (the name is a pun on the word "rakugaki" meaning "scribbling"). The kingdom gets its energy from scribbles, but lately the scribbles are decreasing and the kingdom is in danger of collapsing. To save the country, the military started to capture and force children to scribble.

Cast

Box office 
Debuting 317 screens, the film opened at #1 and sold 212,000 tickets with earnings around 262 million yen (about US$2.47 million) in its opening weekend. By Sixth Weekend, The film dropped from #5 to #7 in ranking and earned overall gross of 1,085,377,700 yen (about US$10.28 million).

References

External links 
 

Crash! Graffiti Kingdom and Almost Four Heroes
Toho animated films
Films postponed due to the COVID-19 pandemic
Anime postponed due to the COVID-19 pandemic
2020 anime films
2020 films